Legends Outlets Kansas City, formerly The Legends at Village West, is a super-regional shopping mall located in the Village West development in Kansas City, Kansas.

The shopping center is surrounded by various other attractions. The shopping center offers more than 110 retail/restaurant outlets including Dave & Buster's and Fuddruckers. Popular department stores and anchors include Books-A-Million, JCPenney, Target, Sam's Club, Walmart, TJ Maxx and Kohl's. The mall also once has a T-Rex Cafe is owned by Landry's which was opened in 2006 and it was closed on August 13, 2017 replaced by Michael Kors.

The Legends at Village West includes an audio walking tour of the more than 80 Kansans who are represented visually on medallions, posters, murals and in sculpture throughout the center. The Legends honors legends of Kansas in athletics, music, exploration, science, technology, politics, art and other fields. The Legends theme is interwoven throughout the facility, offering information about Kansas’ history, heritage and environment. Each corridor and courtyard of the center is dedicated to a particular category of famous Kansans or aspect of the state and its history, such as a replica of The Wizard of Ozs Yellow Brick Road. The mall and surrounding development were highlighted in the Wall Street Journal by Kevin Helliker, discussing the area's resurgence.

The mall went into foreclosure in 2012. After being repurchased by original developer Dan Lowe, it was renamed Legends Outlets Kansas City.'

References

External links
Legends Outlets Kansas City

Buildings and structures in Kansas City, Kansas
Shopping malls in Kansas
Shopping malls established in 2006
Tourist attractions in Wyandotte County, Kansas
2006 establishments in Kansas